Lao-American College Football Club is a Laotian football club competing in the Lao League, the highest level of Laotian football.

Honours

Lao Premier League
Winners (1): 2007

References

External links
 Weltfussballarchiv

Football clubs in Laos
University and college association football clubs